Montana McKinnon (born 14 July 2001) is an Australian rules footballer who plays for Adelaide in the AFL Women's (AFLW).

References

External links
 
 

Living people
2001 births
Adelaide Football Club (AFLW) players
Australian rules footballers from South Australia
South Adelaide Football Club players (Women's)
Sportswomen from South Australia